Eresina jacksoni, the Jackson's eresina, is a butterfly in the family Lycaenidae. It is found in Sierra Leone, Ivory Coast, southern and eastern Nigeria, Cameroon, Uganda and western Kenya. Its habitat consists of dense, primary forests.

References

Butterflies described in 1961
Poritiinae